Giovanni Romagnoli (Faenza, 1893 – Bologna, 1976) was an Italian painter and sculptor.

He trained at the Academy of Fine Arts of Bologna, and specialized in painting female nudes inspired by 19th century painters such as Tranquillo Cremona. He also taught at the Art school of the Carnegie Institute of Pittsburgh.

References

1893 births
1976 deaths
People from Faenza
20th-century Italian painters
Italian male painters
19th-century Italian male artists
20th-century Italian male artists